The R603 is a Regional Route in South Africa.

Route
Its north-western terminus is the N3 near Camperdown, KwaZulu-Natal. It initially heads south, crossing the R103. It then passes just west of Hammarsdale and, after 15 kilometres, it intersects with the R624's eastern terminus, and heads south-east. It ends at an interchange with the N2 at Kingsburgh on the South Coast.

References

Regional Routes in KwaZulu-Natal